Digital Realty Trust, Inc. is a real estate investment trust that invests in carrier-neutral data centers and provides colocation and peering services. As of December 31, 2019, the company owned interests in 225 operating data center facilities totaling 34.5 million rentable square feet in the United States, Europe, Asia, Canada, and Australia. The company's largest operating areas are: Northern Virginia, Dallas, Chicago, New York State, Silicon Valley, and London.

The company is a member of The Green Grid and has helped pioneer concepts of energy efficient and energy conserving data center design.

History
The company was formed in 2004 by GI Partners, which contributed 21 data centers that it acquired through bankruptcy auctions and from distressed companies at a 20–40% discount to replacement cost.

On November 4, 2004, the company became a public company via an initial public offering. At that time, the company owned 23 properties comprising 5.6 million square feet.

In August 2006, the company acquired a property in Phoenix, Arizona for $175 million.

By March 2007, GI Partners had sold all of its shares in the company.

In January 2010, the company acquired three data centers in Massachusetts and Connecticut for $375 million.

In January 2012, the company acquired a 334,000 square foot data center near Hartsfield-Jackson Atlanta International Airport for $63 million in a leaseback transaction. The company also acquired a data center in San Francisco for $85 million.

In April 2013, the company acquired the data center of Delta Air Lines in Eagan, Minnesota for $37 million in a leaseback transaction.

In July 2013, the company doubled capacity at its data center in Chandler, Arizona.

In May 2015, the company sold a building in Philadelphia for $161 million that it acquired in 2005 for $59 million.

In October 2015, the company acquired Telx for $1.886 billion.

In November 2015, the company acquired 125.9 acres of undeveloped land in Loudoun County, Virginia for $43 million and announced plans to build a 2 million square foot data center on the property.

In July 2016, the company acquired 8 data centers in Europe from Equinix for $874 million.

In March 2017, the company announced a $22 million expansion of its data center in Atlanta.

In September 2017, the company completed the acquisition of DuPont Fabros Technology.

In 2018, the Supreme Court ruled in favor of the company in Digital Realty Trust, Inc. v. Somers, a case in which Digital Realty fired an employee who had complained internally about the elimination of supervisory controls and the hiding of cost overruns. After he was fired, the employee sued the company, saying he was protected by whistleblower provisions in Dodd-Frank. However the Supreme Court, citing specific language in Dodd-Frank, ruled that these protections only applied to whistleblowers who had first notified the SEC.

In December 2018, the company acquired Ascenty for $1.8 billion. At the time, Ascenty operated eight data centers in Brazil.

In October 2019, Digital Realty announced the acquisition of European data center provider Interxion for $8.4 billion to “create a leading global provider of data centre, colocation and interconnection solutions”.

In January 2021, Digital Realty announced that the company's headquarters relocation to Austin, Texas.

In January 2022, the company announced a 55% stake acquisition in Teraco Data Centres

References

External links

2004 establishments in California
American companies established in 2004
Data centers
Companies based in Austin, Texas
Companies listed on the New York Stock Exchange
Real estate investment trusts of the United States
Real estate companies established in 2004
Technology companies established in 2004
2004 initial public offerings